Irvine South is one of the nine wards used to elect members of the North Ayrshire council. It was created to cover southern parts of Irvine as the result of a national boundary review prior to the 2017 local elections, taking territory from the existing wards of Irvine West (west of the River Irvine / south of the Annick Water, primarily Fullarton, plus the mainly industrial area around Drybridge and Shewalton) and Irvine East (Broomlands and Dreghorn), returning three councillors. A further re-organisation for the 2022 election in relation to the Islands (Scotland) Act 2018 did not affect the Irvine wards. In 2020, the population was 10,978.

Councillors

Election Results

2022 Election
2022 North Ayrshire Council election

Source:

2017 Election
2017 North Ayrshire Council election

References

Wards of North Ayrshire
Irvine, North Ayrshire
2017 establishments in Scotland